The 2017–18 East Tennessee Buccaneers basketball team represented East Tennessee State University during the 2017–18 NCAA Division I men's basketball season. The Buccaneers, led by third-year head coach Steve Forbes, played their home games at the Freedom Hall Civic Center in Johnson City, Tennessee as of the Southern Conference. They finished the season 25–9, 14–4 in SoCon play to finish in second place. They defeated Chattanooga and Furman to advance to the championship game of the SoCon tournament where they lost to UNC Greensboro. Despite having 25 wins, they did not participate in a postseason tournament.

Previous season
The Buccaneers finished the 2016–17 season 27–8, 14–4 in SoCon play to finish in a three-way tie for the SoCon regular season championship. They defeated Mercer, Samford and UNC Greensboro to become champions of the SoCon tournament. They earned the SoCon's automatic bid to the NCAA tournament where they lost in the first round to Florida.

Roster

}

Schedule and results

|-
!colspan=9 style=| Non-conference regular season

|-
!colspan=9 style=| SoCon regular season

|-
!colspan=9 style=| SoCon tournament

References

East Tennessee State Buccaneers men's basketball seasons
East Tennessee State
East Tennessee
East Tennessee